Dário Cassia Luís Essugo (born 14 March 2005) is a Portuguese professional footballer who plays as a midfielder for Sporting CP B.

Club career
Essugo was born in Odivelas, Lisbon metropolitan area of Angolan descent, and joined Sporting CP's youth academy at the age of 9. On 16 March 2021 he signed his first professional contract and, four days later, before he had even appeared in a match for the junior, under-23 or reserve side, he made his debut in the Primeira Liga with the first team, coming on as a late substitute for João Mário in a 1–0 win against Vitória de Guimarães; at 16 years and 6 days, he became the youngest-ever debutant in the club's history.

On 7 December 2021, Essugo became Portugal's youngest player to debut in the UEFA Champions League, when he took the field in the second half of the 4–2 away loss to AFC Ajax in the group stage aged 16 years and 268 days. He broke another club record the following 5 March, when he surpassed Luís Figo as the youngest starter at 16 years, 11 months and 17 days in a 2–0 home victory over F.C. Arouca.

International career
Essugo represented Portugal at youth level. He was selected for the 2022 UEFA European Under-17 Championship in Israel, scoring in the quarter-finals against France (2–2 after 120 minutes, 6–5 penalty shootout loss).

Career statistics

Honours
Sporting CP
Primeira Liga: 2020–21

References

External links

2005 births
Living people
People from Odivelas
Portuguese sportspeople of Angolan descent
Sportspeople from Lisbon District
Black Portuguese sportspeople
Portuguese footballers
Association football midfielders
Primeira Liga players
Campeonato de Portugal (league) players
Sporting CP footballers
Sporting CP B players
Portugal youth international footballers